Evos or EVOS may refer to:

 EVOS Esports, an Indonesian professional e-sports team
 Ford Evos, a 2021–present American-Chinese mid-size SUV
 Ford Evos (concept car), a 2011 American concept coupe
 Nexplay EVOS, a Filipino e-sports team
 EVOS, a microscope made by Advanced Microscopy Group

See also
 Evo (disambiguation)